Frédérique Meunier (born 8 December 1960) is a French lawyer and politician of Republicans (LR) who has been serving as a member of the French National Assembly since 18 June 2017, representing the department of Corrèze.

Political career 
In parliament, Meunier has been serving on the Committee on Cultural Affairs and Media. Ahead of the Republicans’ 2021 primaries, Meunier endorsed Valérie Pécresse as the party’s candidate for 2022 presidential elections.

See also
 2017 French legislative election

References

1960 births
Living people
Politicians from Paris
Deputies of the 15th National Assembly of the French Fifth Republic
The Republicans (France) politicians
Women members of the National Assembly (France)
21st-century French women politicians
Union of Democrats and Independents politicians
Deputies of the 16th National Assembly of the French Fifth Republic
Members of Parliament for Corrèze